Kovor is a village in the Municipality of Tržič in the Upper Carniola region of Slovenia.

Church

The parish church in the village is dedicated to John the Baptist and was first mentioned in documents dating to 1296. Today's building is from the mid-18th century.

References

External links

Kovor at Geopedia

Populated places in the Municipality of Tržič